Jimmy Napitupulu (born 13 October 1966) is an Indonesian former football referee. He has refereed internationally in the ASEAN Football Championship, and the 2006 FIFA World Cup qualifiers. He is also a referee at the Indonesia Super League.

References

1966 births
Living people
People of Batak descent
Indonesian football referees